"Now" is a 2002 song by British hard rock band Def Leppard, released as the lead single for their X album. It peaked at number 23 on the UK Singles Chart.

Music video
The music video (directed by The Malloys) focuses on a Def Leppard Union Jack T-shirt that finds its way through different owners for nearly two decades. It starts in the year 1983, when a teenage girl purchases the shirt from a music store. One day, as she is sleeping, her younger brother steals the shirt and rides off with his friend to sneak into a neighbour's backyard and use the swimming pool. They quickly run away when the homeowner spots them, leaving the shirt behind.

In 1985, a man buys the shirt at a garage sale. At a parking lot prior to a Def Leppard concert, he surrenders it to a female fan after she flashes him. When the band's tour bus arrives, the female fan has bassist Rick Savage autograph the shirt. Shortly after the concert, she meets a roadie and makes out with him in the bus, where he takes possession of the shirt.

In 1987, the roadie enters a coin-op laundromat to have the shirt and his laundry cleaned. As he sleeps while waiting for his laundry, a woman steals the shirt and slips it between her laundry in a cart.

The video ends in the year 2002, where a woman (presumably an older version of the teenager from the 1983 scene), buys the shirt from an online auction and then receives it in the mail.

Track listing

CD: Bludgeon Riffola - Mercury / 0639822 / Part 1
 "Now"
 "Love Don't Lie (Demo)"
 "Rebel Rebel"
 "Rock Brigade"

CD: Bludgeon Riffola - Mercury / 0639812 / Part 2
 "Now"
 "Let Me Be the One - Demo"
 "Stay With Me"
 "Me and My Wine (Remix)"

CD: Bludgeon Riffola - Mercury / 0639682 (UK) / Part 2
 "Now"
 "Stay With Me"
 "Rebel Rebel"

Charts

References

2002 singles
Def Leppard songs
Songs written by Marti Frederiksen
Music videos directed by The Malloys